Kallan Pavithran is a 1981 Indian Malayalam-language drama film written and directed by P. Padmarajan, based on his own short story of the same name. It stars Nedumudi Venu and Bharath Gopi, along with Subhashini, Beena and Devi in supporting roles. The film revolves around the lives of Pavithran, a petty thief, and Mamachan, a mill owner. Their lives turn upside down when Pavithran finds wealth from an unknown source.

Plot

The profession Pavithran is involved in earned him the title Kallan (thief) Pavithran, the thefts he gets involved were of petty nature. It was as the result of Pavithran's effort to get rid of the title he had with his name that he visited Mamachan the mill owner. Pavithran's request for a job in the mill was turned down by Mamachan. But a theft that occurs in Mamachan's house changes the fate of Pavithran's life forever.

Cast
 Nedumudi Venu as Pavithran
 Bharath Gopi as Mamachan
 Beena Kumbalangi as Damayanthi
 Subhashini as Bhama, Damayanthi's sister
 Devi as Pavithran's first wife
 Prem Prakash as Kuruppu / Taxi driver
 Bhaskara Kurup as Sub-inspector
 Adoor Bhasi as Merchant

References

External links 
 

1981 films
1980s Malayalam-language films
Films with screenplays by Padmarajan
Films directed by Padmarajan